The Schiaffo di Tunisi (literally Slap of Tunis in English), was an expression used by the Italian press and historiographers from the end of the 19th century to describe an episode of the political crisis elapsed at the time between the Kingdom of Italy and the French Third Republic. In 1881, the French government forcefully established a protectorate over Tunisia, which already was a colonial objective of the Kingdom of Italy.

Background

The Italo-Tunisian treaty of 1868 
Tunisia had strategic importance for the European powers when it came to ownership and controlling the flow of trade across the Straits of Sicily. For that reason, Britain would support the French claim to the protectorate, denying Italy the opportunity to develop a stranglehold over shipping routes going through Tunisia and Sicily. (Italians had a long history in Tunisia, tracing back to the 16th century. The Italian language was a lingua franca among merchants, due partially to the existing Italian-Jewish merchant community.)

Italy had close relations with the Bey of Tunis, receiving its own capitulation in 1868 (it), giving it most favored nation status. The international accord granted Italians in Tunisia privileges already conceded to several Italian states pre-unification. Civil equality granted Italians freedom of commerce and extraterritoriality privileges for their factories. In fishing and navigation matters, they benefited from the same treatment as Tunisians. Moreover, the bey couldn't modify tariffs without preemptively consulting the Italian government.

French occupation 

The first foreign policy objective of the second government led by Benedetto Cairoli was the colonisation of Tunisia, to which both France and Italy aspired. Cairoli, like Agostino Depretis before him, never considered to proceed to occupation, being generally hostile towards a militarist policy. However, they relied on a possible British opposition to an enlargement of the French sphere of influence in North Africa (while, if anything, London was hostile about a single country controlling the whole Strait of Sicily).

In the beginning of 1881 France decided to militarily intervene in Tunisia. The motivations of this action were summarised by Jules Ferry, who sustained that the Italians wouldn't have opposed it because some weeks before France had consented to a renewal of the Italo-French trade treaty, Italy was still paying the 600-million-lire debt contracted with France and primarily it was Italy that was politically isolated despite its tentatives towards Berlin and Vienna. Ferry confirmed that it was Otto von Bismarck to invite Paris to act in Tunisia precising that, in case of action, Germany wouldn't have raised objections. While in Italy there was a debate about the reliability of the news about a possible French action in Tunisia, a twenty-thousand-men expeditionary corp was preparing in Toulon. On 3 May a French contingent of two thousand men landed in Bizerte, followed on 11 May by the rest of the forces. The episode gave an ulterior confirm of the Italian political isolation, e rekindled the polemics that had followed the Congress of Berlin three years before. The events, in effect, demonstrated the irrealisability of the foreign policy of Cairoli and of Depretis, the impossibility of an alliance with France and the necessity of a rapprochement with Berlin and with Vienna, even if obtorto collo.

However, such an inversion of the foreign policy of the last decade, couldn't be led by the same men, and Benedetto Cairoli resigned from office on 29 May 1881, thus avoiding that the Camera would openly distrust him; since then he de facto disappeared from the political scene.

Installation of the protectorate 
Tunisia, located between Algeria to the west, French colony since 1830, and Cyrenaica and Tripolitania to the south-west, was then both a French and an Italian strategical objective. The bey's weakness, the intrigues of the ministers, like Mustapha Khaznadar and Mustapha Ben Ismaïl, constant pression from European consuls, the bankruptcy of the State, become hostage of the creditors despite the effort of the reformator Hayreddin Pasha, opened doors to French occupation (hoped by German chancellor Otto von Bismarck to attract French attentions on the Mediterranean, and distract them from the Franco-German border).

On 12 May 1881 the Bardo Treaty was signed under the reign of Sadok Bey: with it the Tunisian State deprived itself of the active legation right, assigning to «French diplomatic and consular agents in foreign countries […] Tunisian protection and interests». The bey, in his turn, couldn't conclude any international act without informing France and obtaining an agreement first. But article 6 of the decree of 9 June allowed him to take part to conclusion of international treaties.

Two years later, the conventions of La Marsa, signed on 5 June 1883, emptied the treaty of its content and violated the intern sovereignty of Tunisia forcing the bey to «proceed to administrative, judiciary and financial reforms that the French government will retain useful» Some decisions couldn't be taken without receiving the approval of the French general resident in Tunisia and of the French government general secretary. In the end, Europeans and Tunisians were equally represented (53 members for each community) in the Grand Council, a consultative assembly elected by universal suffrage with a double turn system.

Consequences 
The European powers reacted differently depending on their interests: the United Kingdom hurried to occupy Egypt, while Germany and Austria-Hungary didn't express dissent about the French behavior.

The Italian immigrants in Tunisia would have protested and caused serious difficulties to France. However, little at a time, the problem was solved and the immigrants could later opt for French nationality and benefit from the same vantages as French colonists. Italo-French relation dangerously fractured. Among the hypotheses weighed by the Italian military staff a possible invasion of the Italian Peninsula by French troops was not excluded.

References

See also 
 Benedetto Cairoli
 Conventions of La Marsa
 Italian Colonial Empire
 Protectorate
 Tunisia
 Bardo Treaty

Italian Empire
History of Tunisia
French Third Republic